Osterseen is a group of lakes in Bavaria, Germany, about 50 km (31 miles) south-south-west of Munich.
At an elevation of 588 m (1,929 feet), its surface area is 223.55 ha (552.4 acres).

Islands 
sorted by water body:

Großer Ostersee
(islands starting from North to South)
 Holzau (6,1 hectares)
 Marieninsel (2,3 hectares, Length 440 m in north–south orientation, width up to 80 metres)
 Steigerinsel (0,45 ha), formerly Putzen Eila
 Roseninsel (0,013 ha oder 130 m2, actually two very small islands)
 Schwaigerinsel (0,75 ha, 40 m distance from western bank)

Frechensee
 unnamed island, c. 20 m distance from northern bank (0,09 ha)
 unnamed island, c. 25 m from western bank (0,13 ha)

Map

See also
List of lakes in Bavaria

References

External links 

Lakes of Bavaria
Weilheim-Schongau